John William Mitchell, MBE (14 June 1917 – 21 November 2005) was a British sound engineer. Throughout his career, he was nominated for two Academy Awards in the category Best Sound, working on 170 films between 1934 and 1998.

Selected filmography
 Diamonds Are Forever (1971)
 A Passage to India (1984)

References

External links

1917 births
2005 deaths
British audio engineers
People from Wakefield
Members of the Order of the British Empire
Emmy Award winners